FC Odesos is a futsal team based in Varna, Bulgaria. It plays in Bulgarian Futsal Championship. The club was officially founded in 2005. Club colors are black and white.

Current Squad 2008/09

Odesos
Sport in Varna, Bulgaria
2005 establishments in Bulgaria
Association football clubs established in 2005